The 2010 Big 12 Conference football season is the 15th season for the Big 12, as part of the 2010 NCAA Division I FBS football season.  It was also the final season in the conference for Colorado and Nebraska as Colorado moved to the Pac-12 and Nebraska transferred to the Big Ten the following season.

Preseason

Coaching changes

Media Poll

Ranked by total points, first place votes shown in parenthesis.

Rankings

All-Big 12 Teams & Awards

First Team

Second Team

Individual Awards

Conference statistical leaders

Records against other conferences

Bowl games

Attendance

Notes

References